Sylvester D. Rhodes (December 1, 1842 – August 29, 1904) was a Union Army soldier during the American Civil War. He received the Medal of Honor for gallantry during the Battle of Fisher's Hill near Strasburg, Virginia fought September 21–22, 1864. The battle was one of the engagements of the Valley Campaigns of 1864.

Rhodes joined the army from Wilkes-Barre, Pennsylvania in September 1861. He was commissioned as an officer in December 1864, and was mustered out in June 1865.

Medal of Honor citation
"The President of the United States of America, in the name of Congress, takes pleasure in presenting the Medal of Honor to Sergeant Sylvester D. Rhodes, United States Army, for extraordinary heroism on 22 September 1864, while serving with Company D, 61st Pennsylvania Infantry, in action at Fisher's Hill, Virginia. Sergeant Rhodes was on the skirmish line which drove the enemy from the first entrenchment and was the first man to enter the breastworks, capturing one of the guns and turning it upon the enemy."

See also

List of American Civil War Medal of Honor recipients: Q-S

References

External links
Military Times Hall of Valor
Findagrave entry

1842 births
1904 deaths
People from Luzerne County, Pennsylvania
People of Pennsylvania in the American Civil War
Union Army soldiers
United States Army Medal of Honor recipients
American Civil War recipients of the Medal of Honor